Marcelio Salas (born 13 October 1929) was a Mexican weightlifter. He competed in the men's bantamweight event at the 1948 Summer Olympics.

References

External links
 

1929 births
Possibly living people
Mexican male weightlifters
Olympic weightlifters of Mexico
Weightlifters at the 1948 Summer Olympics
Pan American Games medalists in weightlifting
Pan American Games bronze medalists for Mexico
Weightlifters at the 1951 Pan American Games
20th-century Mexican people
Medalists at the 1951 Pan American Games